The 1991 DFB-Supercup Final decided the winner of the 1991 edition of the DFB-Supercup, a football competition contested by the winners of the previous season's West German league and cup winners, along with the East German league and cup champions.

The match was played at the Niedersachsenstadion in Hanover, and contested by both West German teams, league champions 1. FC Kaiserslautern and cup winners Werder Bremen. Kaiserslautern won the match 3–1 for their first title.

Teams

Route to the final
Both league champions of West and East Germany met in the first semi-final, before the cup winners met a day later to qualify for the final.

Note: In all results below, the score of the finalist is given first (N: neutral; A: away).

Match

Details

See also
 1990–91 Bundesliga
 1990–91 DFB-Pokal

References

1991 Final
1. FC Kaiserslautern matches
SV Werder Bremen matches
1991–92 in German football cups